School of Engineering and Applied Science is the name of several engineering schools at universities in the United States:

Fu Foundation School of Engineering and Applied Science at Columbia University, founded in 1896
Fred DeMatteis School of Engineering and Applied Science at Hofstra University in New York
George Washington University School of Engineering and Applied Science at George Washington University
Harvard School of Engineering and Applied Sciences at Harvard University
Henry Samueli School of Engineering and Applied Science at the University of California, Los Angeles
Robert R. McCormick School of Engineering and Applied Science at Northwestern University
University of Michigan School for Environment and Sustainability at the University of Michigan, founded in 1927
University of Pennsylvania School of Engineering and Applied Science at the University of Pennsylvania, founded in 1852
University of Virginia School of Engineering and Applied Science at the University of Virginia, founded in 1836
Princeton University School of Engineering and Applied Science
University at Buffalo School of Engineering and Applied Sciences
Washington University School of Engineering and Applied Science at Washington University in St. Louis, founded in 1854